The Free People ( or Κίνημα Ελευθέρων Ανθρώπων, Κ.ΕΛ.ΑΝ.; KELAN) is a political party founded in February 2021 by journalist Giorgos Tragas.

History 
Giorgos Tragas founded the party in February 2021 in the middle of a lockdown due to COVID-19. The purpose of the party is, according to Tragas, to ensure democracy, the fight against unemployment and the economic crisis that emerged from the lockdown due to the COVID-19 pandemic.

According to president Traga the party transcends the divisions of the political spectrum and is not placed on this axis, but is characterized by patriotism and multi-collectivity.

A few days after the founding of the party, the descent of many parties was announced on the ballots of the Free People, such as the Christian Democratic Party of the Overthrow of Nikolaos Nikolopoulos, the Victory Front of Rachel Makris the United Popular Front of Dimitris Kazakis and others.

Tragas died due to COVID-19 complications on 14 December 2021.

References 

Eurosceptic parties in Greece
Conservative parties in Greece
Nationalist parties in Greece
Political parties established in 2021
2021 establishments in Greece